The  are a collection of stone sculptures of Buddhas, in Usuki, Ōita Prefecture, Japan.

History
The Usuki Stone Buddhas were estimated to be carved during the 12th century, and consist of four groups of stone Buddhas. The reason why these stone Buddhas were carved here is unclear.

Cultural Properties
Among Usuki Stone Buddhas, 59 statues are selected as National Treasures of Japan.
They are the first national treasures in Kyūshū, and also the first stone Buddhas selected as national treasures.

Access
There are daily buses from Oita and Usuki Stations; get off at Usuki-Sekibutsu stop.

See also
List of National Treasures of Japan (sculptures)
List of Special Places of Scenic Beauty, Special Historic Sites and Special Natural Monuments

References
Japanese version of Wikipedia

Buildings and structures in Ōita Prefecture
Usuki Stone Buddhas
Tourist attractions in Ōita Prefecture
Buddha statues
Special Historic Sites